The Turnaround Tour was the fourth concert tour by Irish pop band Westlife. The tour covered the UK and Europe in 2004 seen by 490,000 fans making £12,000,000, the tour was also supposed to appear in China, Korea, Hong Kong, Malaysia, Thailand, Philippines and Singapore; however, it was cancelled. Member Brian McFadden left the group on 9 March 2004, just three weeks before the first date of this tour in Belfast.

Support acts
Zoo 
Bellefire (select dates)
The Conway Sisters (select dates)
Kwest (select dates)
Mark Dakriet (select dates)
No Way Out (select dates)
Pop! (select dates)
Sub Bass 5 (select dates)
Traphic (select dates)
Twen2y4se7en (select dates)

Setlist
Set 1
"Turn Around"
"My Girl"
"What Makes a Man"
"World of Our Own"
Set 2
"Flying Without Wings"
"Swear It Again"
"Uptown Girl"
Set 3
Medley:
"Help!"
"I'll Be There For You"
"Wake Me Up Before You Go-Go"
"That's the Way (I Like It)"
"Everybody Needs Somebody to Love"
Set 4
"When You're Looking Like That"
"Tonight"
"On My Shoulder"
"Obvious"
Encore
"Hey Whatever"
"My Love"
"Mandy"

Notes
For concerts in Belfast, the group performed "Lost in You"

Tour dates

Festivals and other miscellaneous performances
These concerts were a part of the "Liverpool Summer Pops"

Cancellations and rescheduled shows

Box office score data

Live Concert Music DVD

Chart performance

Certifications and sales

Personnel
MANAGEMENT: Louis Walsh Management Company 
DIRECTOR: Julia Knowles 
EXECUTIVE PRODUCER: Solomon Nwabueze 
PHOTOGRAPHY: Jason Faser/PA Photos Limited

External links

Official Westlife Website

References

Westlife concert tours
2004 concert tours